Barenaked For Hanukkah in an EP released by Barenaked Ladies on November 15, 2005. It contains two tracks from the holiday-themed Barenaked for the Holidays, and one live version of a track from that album.

Track listing

Certifications
The EP was certified gold in Canada.

References

2005 EPs
Live EPs
Barenaked Ladies EPs
2005 live albums
Hanukkah music